Here Comes Inspiration is a studio album by Paul Williams, released in 1974. Notable songs from the album include "Rainy Days & Mondays", "You & Me Against the World" and "If We Could Still Be Friends". Kenny Ascher was credited for the production, arrangements and conducting. Film composer John Williams arranged and conducted his song "Dream Away", George Tipton arranged "If We Could Still Be Friends". Clarinet was by Tom Scott, flugelhorn by Chuck Findley and percussion by Victor Feldman.

Track listing 
Words & music by Paul Williams; unless otherwise stated

Side One
 "Nilsson Sings Newman" 0:54 -                              (Paul Williams, Kenny Ascher)
 "You and Me Against the World" 3:44                          (Paul Williams, Kenny Ascher)
 "You Know Me" 3:34                                         (Paul Williams, Kenny Ascher)
 "Born to Fly" 3:03                                         
 "That's What Friends Are For" 3:58
 "Rainy Days & Mondays" 3:38     (Paul Williams, Roger Nichols)

Side Two
 "Inspiration" 3:08                                         (Paul Williams, Kenny Ascher)
 "If We Could Still Be Friends" 3:02                        
 "What Would They Say" 2:41
 "Driftwood" 3:42
 "In the Beginning" 3:37                                    (Paul Williams, Ron Davies)
 "Dream Away" 4:22                                          (Paul Williams, Johnny Williams)

Charts

References

1974 albums
Paul Williams (songwriter) albums
A&M Records albums
Albums recorded at A&M Studios